Venevision Plus was a cable television channel within the Grupo Cisneros, controlled by tycoon Gustavo Cisneros, which holds 100% stake channel. Venevision Plus is based in Miami and from December 1, 2007, its signal is transmitted in Venezuela, while in 2008 came to Chile, Mexico and Argentina.  In August 2010 it was launched  Venevision Plus Dominicana, which its design for the Dominican Republic audience.

Programs

Novelas

Current Telenovelas
 Los Secretos de Lucía at 8 pm
 Guerra de mujeres at 11 pm

Previous Telenovelas

Travesuras del Corazon
 Pobre Millonaria
Torrente
¿Vieja Yo?
Entire life
The mysteries of love
Cosita Rica
The Gonzalez
Ángel Rebelde
 Women's War'Valeria

Humorous
 Lente Loco (2007/2008)
 Mad and loose (2007/2008)
 Qué Locura
  Marry and You'll See

Competitions and varieties
 Tu Desayuno Alegre
 Architect of Dreams
 Sabado Gigante
 ¡ Live the dream !
 Don Francisco Presenta
 The Great Navigator
 The battle of the sexes
 Super Sábado Sensacional
 A tu Salud Light

Talkshows
 Who is right?
 Cases of Family
 Women's history and men too
 Marta Susana (talk show)

Slogans2007:More Entertainment, More Excitement2008:Para ti2009':Every day a new emotion''

Coming Soon 

 Another question
 First Impact
 Wake up America

Venevisión
Spanish-language television stations in the United States
Television channels and stations established in 2007